El Dorado High School is a public high school in Placerville, California, United States. EDHS is one of six high schools in the El Dorado Union High School District, it is a California Distinguished School.

Statistics

Demographics 
2016-17

Notable alumni

 Andre Fili, UFC fighter
 Toby Hall, catcher for the Chicago White Sox
 Thomas Kinkade, painter  
 Spider Sabich, professional and Olympic skier
 Skip Vanderbundt, linebacker with the San Francisco Forty-Niners

References

External links
 El Dorado High School official website

High schools in El Dorado County, California
Placerville, California
Public high schools in California
Educational institutions established in 1928
1928 establishments in California